Oceans of Time is an album by American jazz drummer Billy Hart recorded in 1996 and released on the Arabesque label.

Reception
The Allmusic review by David R. Adler awarded the album 3 stars. JazzTimes' Bill Bennett said "The ensemble concept works from an acoustic foundation, with violin, reeds and guitar layering on timbral and textural range. What Hart seeks, and finds, in his bandmates is that ability to shift gears, to move from inside to outside, to follow his rhythmic cues from the realm of dense, atmospheric arrangements into more direct renderings of the blues sensibility. Hart's inherent lyricism holds it all together, interacting freely with the beat without ever losing the swing factor. This is truly a band worth hearing".

Track listing
All compositions by Billy Hart except as indicated
 "One for Carter" (John Stubblefield) - 6:50
 "Téulé's Redemption" - 12:03
 "Shadow" (Dave Kikoski) - 7:11
 "Oceans of Time" - 9:30
 "Tosh" (Chris Potter) - 8:36
 "Mind Reader" (Santi Debriano) - 10:50
 "Father Demo Square" (Mark Feldman) - 8:13
 "Offering" (Debriano) - 8:29

Personnel
Billy Hart - drums
Chris Potter - soprano saxophone, tenor saxophone, bass clarinet
John Stubblefield - tenor saxophone, soprano saxophone 
David Fiuzynski - guitar  
David Kikoski - piano 
Mark Feldman - violin
Santi Debriano - bass

References

Arabesque Records albums
Billy Hart albums
1997 albums